Answerth is a surname. Notable people with the surname include:

 Clarrie Answerth (1901–1981), Australian rules footballer
 Noah Answerth (born 1999), Australian rules footballer